Jazzelle Zanaughtti (born 1995) is a visual artist and fashion model known for their unique makeup and clothing style.

Biography 
Jazzelle Zanaughtti was born in Detroit. They later moved to Chicago, working as a nightlife figure and model. With an authentically unconventional makeup and fashion style, Zanaughtti gained a sizable Instagram following. In 2015, their unique appearance caught the attention of photographer, Nick Knight, who invited Zanaughtti to a fashion photography collaboration. After the collaboration, Zanaughtti gained notoriety and moved to New York City to pursue a growing modeling career.

Art 
In the early 2010s, Zanaughtti co-hosted a weekly party, Soft Leather, which was popular in the Chicago night life scene. Their first major commercial breakthrough was a fashion photoshoot with Nick Knight for Comme des Garçons in 2015. The two also collaborated on a digital fashion project, ikon-1, in 2022. Zanaughtti's further achievements in the fashion industry include walking for Mugler, Savage x Fenty, and Gareth Pugh.  They have represented Mercedes Benz, Nike, and ASOS. Zanaughtti has been featured in publications such as international editions of Vogue, PAPER, and i-D.

Further reading 
 Zhang, Tianwei. “Nick Knight's Metaverse Dream Comes With NFT Project.” WWD, 2022, p.12-12. ISSN: 0149-5380
 Nick Knight’s SHOWstudio NFT Collection “ikon-1” Sets the Standard for Fashion in the Metaverse (p. 290–). (2022). NewsRX LLC.

External links 
 https://www.instagram.com/uglyworldwide/

References 
Wikipedia Student Program